The 1982 Jordanian  League (known as The Jordanian  League, was the 32nd season of Jordan  League since its inception in 1944. Al-Ramtha won its second title.

Teams

Map

Overview
Al-Ramtha won the championship.

League final standings

Promoted: Al-Nasr and Al-Balqa

References
RSSSF

Jordanian Pro League seasons
Jordan
Jordan
football